Diana Chire is a London-based Egyptian artist and director who first received national attention when she presented herself nude in her exhibit at the 2015 Frieze Art Fair in London. Her art themes feature gender, sexuality and the nature of racial identity.

Biography
Chire was born in Egypt, and moved to London, England, when she was five. She studied at Westminster University. She is the editor and publisher of arts newspaper She-Zine.

Chire is known for her performance artworks that focus on black female identity, exposing the gender imbalances in the art world, and for using her own body as a medium. She shaved her head in 2016, explaining that as she became more comfortable with using her body as a medium, she felt she no longer needed to wear weaves or straighten her hair to be beautiful. She stitched her weave onto pillowcases.

References

1987 births
Artists from London
Living people
British women film directors
Women magazine editors
Place of birth missing (living people)
Nationality missing
British women artists